Food of Love may refer to:
Food of Love (1997 film), a British film
Food of Love (2002 film), a Spanish/German film
Food of Love (album), a 1973 album by Yvonne Elliman